The Hills of Indiana is a 1971 album by Lonnie Mack. The album marked a divergence from Mack's previous recordings by focusing on country rock and roots rock instead of blues rock and rhythm and blues.

Track listing
"Asphalt Outlaw Hero" (Don Nix) 3:04
"Florida" (Don Nix) 3:08
"Lay It Down"  (Gene Thomas)  3:51
"The Hills of Indiana" (Mack) 3:42
"Uncle Pen" (Bill Monroe)  1:51
"Bicycle Annie"   5:09
"A Fine Way to Go" (Carole King)  3:07
"Rings" (Eddie Reeves, Alex Harvey)  3:12
"The Man in Me"  (Bob Dylan) 3:08
"She Even Woke Me Up to Say Goodbye" (Mickey Newbury, Doug Gilmore) 3:19
"All Good Things Will Come to Pass" (Don Nix) 3:27
"Three Angels" (Don Nix) 4:31

Personnel
Lonnie Mack - guitar, vocals
Buddy Spicher - fiddle
David Briggs - keyboards
Lloyd Green - steel guitar
Don Nix - baritone saxophone, vocals on "Three Angels"
Troy Seals - bass, vocals
Barry Beckett - keyboards
Kenny Buttrey - drums
Tim Drummond - bass
Roger Hawkins - drums
David Hood - bass
Mount Zion Singers - vocals
Wayne Perkins - guitar
Norbert Putnam - bass, horn and string arrangements

References

Lonnie Mack albums
1971 albums
Elektra Records albums